Don Wells (July 12, 1922 – February 14, 1984) was a defensive end in the National Football League. He was drafted by the Green Bay Packers in the sixth round of the 1945 NFL Draft and would later play four season with the team.

References

People from Waycross, Georgia
Green Bay Packers players
American football defensive ends
Georgia Bulldogs football players
1922 births
1984 deaths
Place of death missing
Players of American football from Georgia (U.S. state)